Saint-Maurice-du-Désert is a former commune in the Orne department in north-western France. On 1 January 2016, it was merged into the new commune of Les Monts d'Andaine.

See also
Communes of the Orne department
Parc naturel régional Normandie-Maine

References

Saintmauricedudesert